Ireland issued a 2 euro commemorative coin in 2007.

Obverse design

A book on a generic design with 12 stars in the outer ring.

Reverse design

A map of Europe with the denomination superimposed with lines and 12 stars.

Obverse inscription

'CONRADH NA RÓIMHE 50 BLIAIN' - Treaty of Rome 50 Years.

'AN EORAIP' - Europe.

'ÉIRE 2007' - Ireland 2007.

Metallic composition

Bimetallic - Nordic gold centre and cupro-nickel outer ring.

Edge

Milled edge with an alternating pattern of '2's and stars incuse.

Alignment

Medallic alignment.

Type of coin

Currency coin and commemorative coin.

Obverse designer

Reverse designer

Mint

Irish Mint, Dublin, Ireland.

Mintage figure

Catalogue number

Not yet listed in the Standard Catalog of World Coins.

Remarks

The obverse inscription is in the Irish-Gaelic language.

This coin was issued by the Republic of Ireland during the term of Mary McAleese, President of Ireland (1997 - 2011).

Obverse picture

Reverse picture

See also

 Commemorative coins of Ireland

Decimal coins of Ireland
Two-base-unit coins